Chuck Spieser (August 2, 1929 – December 21, 1996) was an American boxer. He competed in the men's light heavyweight event at the 1948 Summer Olympics.

References

External links
 

1929 births
1996 deaths
American male boxers
Olympic boxers of the United States
Boxers at the 1948 Summer Olympics
Boxers from Detroit
Light-heavyweight boxers